Unio mancus is a species of freshwater mussel, an aquatic bivalve mollusk in the family Unionidae, the river mussels.

Subspecies
 Unio mancus mancus Lamarck, 1819
 Unio mancus requienii Michaud, 1831
 Unio mancus turtonii Payraudeau, 1826

Distribution
This species can be found from northeast Spain throughout the Mediterranean zone, northeast Africa and in the Middle East. It is present in Austria, Bosnia and Herzegovina, Croatia, Cyprus, France, Greece, Italy, Lebanon, Montenegro, Slovenia, Spain, Switzerland, Syria and Turkey.

Description
These freshwater mussels have a dark brown or yellowish-green periostracum. The shells are equivalve, inequilateral and oval-shaped, with a rounded anterior margin and a truncated posterior margin. The inner is iridescent white.

References

 Rossmässler, E. A. (1854-1858). Iconographie der Land- & Süßwasser-Mollusken Europa's, mit vorzüglicher Berücksichtigung kritischer und noch nicht abgebildeter Arten. (1) 3

External links
 Lamarck [J.-B. M. de. (1819). Histoire naturelle des animaux sans vertèbres. Tome 6(1): vi + 343 pp. Paris: published by the author.]
 Lea, I. (1834). Observations on the naïades; and descriptions of new species of that, and other families. Transactions of the American Philosophical Society. (NS) 5: 23-119, pls 1-19
 Locard, A. (1882). Prodrome de malacologie française. [I. Catalogue général des mollusques vivants de France. Mollusques terrestres, des eaux douces et des eaux saumâtres. vi + 462 pp. Lyon: Henri Georg.]
 Drouët, H. (1888). Unionidae nouveaux ou peu connus (5ème article). Journal de Conchyliologie. 36(1): 103-111
  Kobelt, W. (1910-1911). In: Rossmässler, E.A., Iconographie der Land- & Süßwasser-Mollusken mit vorzüglicher Berücksichtigung der europäischen noch nicht abgebildeten Arten, (2) 17 (1/2): 1-24, pl. 451-460
 Marrone F., Nardi G., Cianfanelli S., Govedič M., Barra S.A., Arculeo M. & Bodon M. (2019). Diversity and taxonomy of the genus Unio Philipsson in Italy, with the designation of a neotype for Unio elongatulus C. Pfeiffer (Mollusca, Bivalvia, Unionidae). Zootaxa. 4545(3): 339-374
 Froufe, E.; Lopes-Lima, M.; Riccardi, N.; Zaccara, S.; Vanetti, I.; Lajtner, J.; Teixeira, A.; Varandas, S.; Prié, V.; Zieritz, A.; Sousa, R.; Bogan, A. E. (2017). Lifting the curtain on the freshwater mussel diversity of the Italian Peninsula and Croatian Adriatic coast. Biodiversity and Conservation. 26(14): 3255-3274

mancus
Bivalves described in 1819